My Ages Apart is a 2017 comedy drama produced by TVB starring Bobby Au-yeung, Moses Chan, Louis Cheung, Kristal Tin, Ali Lee and Maggie Shiu.

Plot
Sung Chung Kei (Bobby Au-yeung) and his mentee Kwong Kong Sang (Moses Chan) are two major investment bankers. However, Kong Sang uses unscrupulous methods which caused tension between them. During a plane crash, Chung Kei accidentally switches his soul with Bau Pau (James Ng)  using a face-off card and is forced to live with his aunt, Bau Mei Na (Maggie Shiu). He also suspects that his wife, Ling Kit Yu (Kristal Tin) is having an affair with Kong Sang. Chung Kei decides to work with Kong Sang to find his lost soul. Kong Sang teams up with Sheung Ho Yiu (Ali Lee) in order to take revenge on the Sheung family. Lau Hang (Louis Cheung) is also seeking revenge on behalf of his godfather. The trio then embark on a time-travelling revenge plot ...

Cast

Sung family

Kwong family

Sheung family

Bau family

Other cast

Guest Star appearance

Viewership ratings

Awards and nominations

Asian Television Awards 2018
 Nominated - Best Comedy Programme
 Nominated - Best Actress (Ali Lee)

References

TVB dramas
Hong Kong television series
Hong Kong time travel television series
2010s Hong Kong television series